Maryland's Legislative District 14 is one of 47 districts in the state for the Maryland General Assembly. It covers part of Montgomery County.

Demographic characteristics
As of the 2020 United States census, the district had a population of 130,784, of whom 101,203 (77.4%) were of voting age. The racial makeup of the district was 56,800 (43.4%) White, 35,475 (27.1%) African American, 588 (0.4%) Native American, 16,160 (12.4%) Asian, 50 (0.0%) Pacific Islander, 8,934 (6.8%) from some other race, and 12,741 (9.7%) from two or more races. Hispanic or Latino of any race were 18,392 (14.1%) of the population.

The district had 93,228 registered voters as of October 17, 2020, of whom 19,215 (20.6%) were registered as unaffiliated, 20,010 (21.5%) were registered as Republicans, 52,824 (56.7%) were registered as Democrats, and 733 (0.8%) were registered to other parties.

Political representation
The district is represented for the 2023–2027 legislative term in the State Senate by Craig Zucker (D) and in the House of Delegates by Anne R. Kaiser (D), Bernice Mireku-North (D), and Pamela E. Queen (D).

References

Montgomery County, Maryland
14
14